Bugs & Daffy: The Wartime Cartoons is a 1989 direct-to-video program by MGM/UA Home Video, containing 11 Looney Tunes and Merrie Melodies shorts, all of which are centered on World War II. Film critic Leonard Maltin (Entertainment Tonight) tells trivia and facts about each animated short.

Features

Notes

Voice cast 
 Mel Blanc: Bugs Bunny, The Gremlins from the Kremlin, Daffy Duck, Porky Pig, additional voices
 Billy Bletcher: Wolf
 Sara Berner: Hatta Mari
 Bea Benaderet: Little Red Riding Hood, additional voices
 Richard Bickenbach: Crosby rooster
 Robert C. Bruce: Radio announcer, Narrator
 Kent Rogers: Professor Canafrazz
 Tedd Pierce: Observer

References

External links 
 

1989 films
Looney Tunes shorts
1980s American animated films
World War II and the media
Looney Tunes home video releases
1989 animated films
1989 short films
Bugs Bunny
1980s English-language films